The Tajik Soviet Encyclopedia is the first universal encyclopedia in the Tajik language, published in Dushanbe from 1978 to 1988 in eight volumes. An additional volume, Tajik SSR, was published in both Tajik and Russian.

The main editor was the president of the Academy of Sciences of the Tajik SSR, Mukhamed Asimov.

See also 
 Great Soviet Encyclopedia

References

Tajikistani culture
Soviet culture
Tajik Soviet Socialist Republic
Tajik language
1978 non-fiction books
20th-century encyclopedias
Tajik encyclopedias
National Soviet encyclopedias